Labocania is a genus of carnivorous theropod dinosaur of uncertain affinities from Baja California, Mexico, which lived 73 million years ago, in the Campanian stage of the late Cretaceous Period.

In the summer of 1970, the National Geographic Society and the Los Angeles County Museum of Natural History organized a joint paleontological expedition, led by geologist William J. Morris, to the Arroyo del Rosario in Baja California. While prospecting, volunteer Harley James Garbani discovered the skeleton of a theropod north of Punta Baja near Cerro Rayado. Garbani excavated the site in 1970 and 1971.

The type species, Labocania anomala, was described and named by Ralph Molnar in 1974. The generic name references the La Bocana Roja Formation, named after la Bocana Roja, "the red estuary". The specific name means "anomalous" in Latin, in reference to the distinctive build.

The holotype, IGM 5307 (formerly LACM 20877), was found in a layer of the La Bocana Roja Formation, dating from the late Campanian, about 73 million years old. It consists of a very fragmentary skeleton with skull elements, including a right quadrate, a left frontal, a piece of the left maxilla, a fragment of the dentarium, a chevron, the upper parts of both ischia, the middle shaft of the right pubis, most of the second right metatarsal, a pedal phalanx and several loose teeth. The elements were not articulated, dispersed over a surface of about two square metres, and strongly weathered. The remains were mixed with the ribs of Hadrosauroidea.

Gregory S. Paul estimated its length at 7 meters (23 ft), its weight at 1.5 tonnes (1.65 short tons) in 2010. In 2016 Molina-Pérez and Larramendi gave a higher estimation of 8.2 meters (27 ft) and 2.6 tonnes (2.86 short tons). The cranial elements are very robust, and the frontals in particular are strongly thickened. The teeth of the maxilla are gradually recurving and rather flat; those of the premaxilla do not have a D-shaped cross-section.

Because Labocania is based on fragmentary material, its affinities are uncertain. Molnar noted certain similarities between Labocania and tyrannosaurids, especially in the form of the ischium which features a low triangular obturator process and a circular lateral scar on the upper end, but he did not assign Labocania to any family, placing it as Theropoda incertae sedis. Molnar especially compared Labocania with Indosaurus and "Chilantaisaurus" maortuensis, later made the separate genus Shaochilong. Labocania was considered as a possible tyrannosauroid in the 2004 review of the group by Thomas R. Holtz Jr., who, however, pointed out that the similarities with the Tyrannosauridae were shared with the Coelurosauria in general—no tyrannosauroid synapomorphies were present—and that Labocania also showed some abelisaurid traits such as the thick frontals and a reclining quadrate. On the other hand, the L-shaped chevron and the flattened outer side of the second metatarsal indicated a position in the Tetanurae.

References 

Prehistoric neotheropods
Campanian genus first appearances
Campanian genus extinctions
Late Cretaceous dinosaurs of North America
Cretaceous Mexico
Fossils of Mexico
Fossil taxa described in 1974
Taxa named by Ralph Molnar